Sean Gallagher may refer to:

Sean Gallagher (actor) (born 1965), English actor
Sean Gallagher (baseball) (born 1985), Major League Baseball pitcher for the Colorado Rockies
Seán Gallagher (born 1962), Irish entrepreneur, television personality and candidate in the 2011 and 2018 Irish presidential elections

See also
Seán Ó Gallchóir, Irish sports statistician
Shaun Gallagher, American philosopher
Shaun Gallagher (author), American nonfiction writer
Shawn Gallagher of Beyond the Embrace